The 2009–10 season is Real Sociedad's last season to date in the second division. After three seasons in the second division the club obtained promotion on the 41st match day.

Season summary
The season began with the appointment of Martín Lasarte as new coach. The Uruguayan, with no experience in European football, was chosen by Jokin Aperribay as a replacement for Juan Manuel Lillo. The preceding season under Lillo was one of the worst in the club's history, as the club never challenged for promotion.

During the transfer window, the club hired several players on loan, who would prove to be key to the club’s promotion. By September, the club had reached promotion spots, a place they would not leave for the rest of the season. The winter break was preceded by a home win against Real Betis. Real Sociedad topped the table with 35 points by Christmas, two points above second-placed Hércules. After losing on the 21st matchday, Real Sociedad temporarily lost their first place.

Towards the end of the season, Real Betis began challenging for promotion and beat Real Sociedad in Seville. In late May, they joined Levante, Hércules and Real Sociedad in a tight promotion race. However, the Andalusians would fall short and fail to obtain promotion. Real Sociedad bounced back after their defeat against Betis and won three games in a row. A home win against Celta de Vigo, the last of those three, sealed promotion.

In the Copa del Rey, Real Sociedad were knocked out in the first round by Rayo Vallecano, who disposed of the Guipuscoan club with ease.

Squad information

League

References

External links
Squad and fixtures on Bdfutbol

Real Sociedad
Real Sociedad seasons